The Diocese of Toledo in America is a Latin Church ecclesiastical jurisdiction, or diocese, of the Catholic Church covering nineteen counties in northwestern Ohio in the United States.

The diocese is a suffragan see of the metropolitan Archdiocese of Cincinnati. The See city for the diocese is Toledo. The eighth and current bishop of Toledo is Daniel Thomas. Our Lady, Queen of the Most Holy Rosary Cathedral is the mother church of the diocese.

History

1700 to 1900 
During the 17th century, present day Ohio was part of the French colony of New France. The Diocese of Quebec, had jurisdiction over the region. In 1763, Ohio Country became part of the British Province of Quebec, forbidden from settlement by American colonists. After the American Revolution, the Ohio area became part of the new United States.  For Catholics, Ohio was now under the jurisdiction of the Archdiocese of Baltimore, which then comprised the entire country.

In 1808, Pope Pius VII erected the Diocese of Bardstown in Kentucky, with jurisdiction over the new state of Ohio along with the other midwest states. Pope Pius VII on June 19, 1821, erected the Diocese of Cincinnati, taking the entire state of Ohio from the Diocese of Bardstown. Pope Pius IX erected the Diocese of Cleveland on April 23, 1847, with territory taken from the Archdiocese of Cincinnati. At that point, the diocese included counties around Toledo, Ohio.

1900 to 1950 
Pius X erected the Diocese of Toledo on April 15, 1910, in territory taken from the Diocese of Cleveland.  The pope named Auxiliary Bishop Joseph Schrembs of the Diocese of Grand Rapids as the first bishop of the new diocese. Schrembs requested the Sisters of Saint Francis of Rochester, Minnesota, to send nuns to the Toledo area to work with the children of the Polish immigrants. Sister Adelaide Sandusky, director of the College of St. Teresa, and 22 other Sisters began teaching in Toledo schools. This community became the Sisters of St. Francis of Sylvania, Ohio From 1911 to 1921, Schrembs established 13 new parishes and 33 schools. At Schrembs' invitation, Visitation nuns came to Toledo in 1915 from their Georgetown monastery in Washington, D.C.

In 1921, Pope Pius XI appointed Schrembs as bishop of the Diocese of Cleveland. His replacement in Toledo was Reverend Samuel Stritch, named by Pius XI in 1921. During his tenure as bishop, Stritch established Mary Manse College in Toledo in 1922 and incorporated the diocesan Catholic Charities in 1923. He also oversaw the beginning of the construction of Holy Rosary Cathedral, whose cornerstone was laid by Cardinal János Csernoch in 1926. In 1930, Pius XI named Stritch as archbishop of the Archdiocese of Milwaukee.  To replace Stritch, the pope named Reverend Karl Alter, the first priest from the diocese to become its bishop.

During his tenure as bishop, Alter completed construction of Holy Rosary Cathedral in Toledo and built an addition to Central Catholic High School in Toledo. He established DeSales College in Toledo in 1942 and donated a 12-acre (49,000 m2) parcel of land in East Toledo for the construction of St. Charles Hospital. In 1950, after 20 years as bishop of Toledo, Alter was named archbishop of Cincinnati by Pope Pius XII.

1950 to present 
Alter was replaced in Toledo by Auxiliary Bishop George Rehring of the Archdiocese of Cincinnati by Pius XII in 1950. He retired in 1967. Pope Paul VI then named Auxiliary Bishop John Donovan from the Archdiocese of Detroit as the new bishop of Toledo.

Donovan implemented the reforms of the Second Vatican Council in the diocese by joining the Ohio Council of Churches, and establishing a permanent diaconate and a chancery office for divorced, separated, and widowed Catholics. In 1967, he issued a pastoral letter endorsing open housing, which was defeated in a citywide referendum that fall. He also established the Diocesan Development Fund and special programs for Spanish-speaking, African American and elderly Catholics. During his tenure, Donovan also established Resurrection Parish in Lexington, Ohio, in 1969 and St. Joan of Arc Parish in Toledo in 1978. He increased the number of Catholics in the diocese from 301,000 to 348,000.  Donovan retired in 1980.

The next bishop of Toledo was Auxiliary Bishop James Hoffman, appointed by Pope John Paul II in 1980.  Hoffman died in 2003 and was replaced by Auxiliary Bishop Leonard Blair of the Archdiocese of Detroit, named by John Paul II.  On May 9. 2005, Blair directed the Sisters of St. Francis to cancel a three-workshop by New Ways Ministry at the order's campus in Tiffin, Ohio. In stating his objections, Blair stated:The positions of New Ways Ministry are not at all in accord with the guidelines for pastoral care which the bishops of the United States issued in 2006 regarding 'Ministry to Persons with a Homosexual Inclination.In July 2011, Blair told parishes and parochial schools in the diocese not to raise funds for the Susan G. Komen Foundation, citing concerns that the money could be used to fund embryonic stem-cell research. Pope Francis appointed Blair as archbishop of the Archdiocese of Hartford in 2013. Francis in 2014 appointed Auxiliary Bishop Daniel Thomas from the Archdiocese of Philadelphia as the new and current bishop of the Diocese of Toledo.

Sex Abuse

Bishop Hoffman was criticized for his handling of sexual abuse cases in the diocese, which had 11 lawsuits filed against it. In 1992, he placed Reverend Robert J. Fisher in active ministry after the latter admitted to molesting a 14-year-old girl and spent 30 days in prison. Hoffman suspended Fisher in 2002 due to "the media climate," but said he had no plans to remove other such priests. He later declared, "My difficulty with zero tolerance is that the Gospel teaches reconciliation. We believe in forgiveness."

On August 18, 2020, the Federal Bureau of Investigation (FBI) arrested Reverend Michael Zacharias, a diocesan priest, on charges of sex trafficking, coercion and enticement. Zacharias was accused of grooming and engaging in sexual conduct with minors since the late 1990s. On September 6, 2020, the Toledo Blade reported that there were flaws in the diocese's efforts to combat sex abuse, such as the lack of psychological evaluations.

Bishops

Bishops of Toledo
 Joseph Schrembs (1911–1921), appointed Bishop of Cleveland and archbishop (personal title) in 1939
 Samuel Alphonsius Stritch (1921–1930), appointed Archbishop of Milwaukee and later Archbishop of Chicago and Pro-Prefect of the Sacred Congregation for the Propagation of the Faith (elevated to cardinal in 1946)
 Karl Joseph Alter (1931–1950), appointed Archbishop of Cincinnati
 George John Rehring (1950–1967)
 John Anthony Donovan (1967–1980)
 James Robert Hoffman (1980–2003)
 Leonard Paul Blair (2003–2013), appointed Archbishop of Hartford
 Daniel Edward Thomas (2014–present)

Auxiliary bishops
 Albert Henry Ottenweller (1974–1977), appointed Bishop of Steubenville
 James Robert Hoffman (1978–1980)
 Robert William Donnelly (1984–2006)

Other priests of the diocese who became bishops
 Augustus John Schwertner, appointed Bishop of Wichita in 1921
 John Stowe, OFM Conv., Bishop of Lexington in 2015

Coat of arms 
The arms of the Diocese of Toledo are based upon those of Toledo, Spain, which bears a silver tower on a plain red field. By changing the field to one half of blue (dexter) and half of red (sinister) the arms are significantly different from the original, and there is effected, in conjunction with the silver tower, a combination of red, white, and blue. The tower is marked with a red cross.

Heraldist Pierre de Chaignon la Rose designed the diocesan arms in 1912. The formal heraldic blazon is Per pale azure and gules, a tower triply-turreted, the central turret the tallest, argent, charged with a cross-humetty of the second.

Territory

The Diocese contains about 319,907 Catholics in an area population of 1,465,561.

General information

Parishes

The Roman Catholic Diocese of Toledo currently has 124 parishes.

Personnel
In 2014, the Diocese of Toledo had 210 total priests, of whom 38 were from religious orders serving in the diocese and 68 were retired/senior status.  It also had 10 religious brothers, 440 women religious (sisters), 197 permanent deacons and 23 diocesan seminarians.
In 2018, the Diocese of Toledo had 203 total priests, of whom 63 were retired/senior status.  Also included in the total number of priests are 44 from religious orders serving in the diocese (32 active, and 12 retired/senior status).  The diocese also had 9 religious brothers, 410 religious women (sisters), 187 permanent deacons and 17 diocesan seminarians.

Education
As of 2018, the Diocese of Toledo had:
54 elementary schools serving 10,561 students  
13 Catholic high schools serving 4,170 students  
2 colleges/universities with 3,816 full- and part-time students

Sacraments
3,006 Infant and Child Baptisms
357 Adult Baptisms
3,462 First Communions
3,287 Confirmations
1,117 Marriages

Catholic Charities
Ministries/Services
Food
Helping Hands of St. Louis
H.O.P.E. Pantry
Housing Shelters
La Posada
Miriam House
Housing Services
Homelessness Prevention
Supportive Housing
Life & Home Management Workshops
Community Emergency Services
Family Support
Adoption Services
Pregnancy Support
Respect Life Ministry
Abortion Healing/Support
Bereavement Ministry
Elder Guardianship Services
Rural Life Ministry
Jail & Prison Ministry
Catholic Club – Daycare
Elder Ministry
Community Services
Campaign for Human Development
Disaster Response

Schools

Elementary schools

High schools

Former schools
 Alter Elementary, Rossford, Ohio (now All Saints)
 Divine Word Seminary Perrysburg (closed in 1984)
 Franciscan Academy, Sylvania (closed, 2014)
 Holy Angels, Sandusky (combined with Sandusky Central Catholic Schools)
 Holy Spirit Seminary Toledo (closed in 1982)
 Immaculate Conception, Toledo (combined with Sts. Peter & Paul to form Queen of Peace)
Mary Immaculate Elementary (closed, 2013)
 McAuley High School, Toledo
 Pope John Paul II, Toledo (closed, 2008)
 Queen of Peace, Toledo (combined with St. James to form Queen of Apostles)
 St. Adalbert, Toledo (combined with St. Hedwig to form Pope John Paul II in 2005)
 St. Agnes, Toledo (closed, 2005)
Saint Bernard Elementary, New Washington(closed,2021)
 St. Charles, Toledo (closed, 2008)
St. Clement, Toledo (closed)
 St. Hedwig, Toledo (combined with St. Adalbert to form Pope John Paul II in 2005)
 St. Hyacinth, Toledo (closed, 2005)
 St. James, Toledo (combined with Queen of Peace to form Queen of Apostles)
St. John the Baptist, Toledo (closed, 2016)
 St. Jude, Toledo (closed, 2002)
 St. Martin de Porres, Toledo (closed, 2002)
 St. Mary, Sandusky (combined with Sandusky Central Catholic Schools)
 St. Mary of the Assumption, Toledo (closed, 2002)
 Sts. Peter & Paul, Toledo (combined with Immaculate Conception to form Queen of Peace)
 Sts Peter and Paul, Sandusky (combined with Sandusky Central Catholic Schools)
 St. Thomas Aquinas, Sacred Heart, St. Stephen (Toledo) and St. Jerome (Walbridge) combined to form Kateri Catholic Academy, later renamed Cardinal Stritch Catholic Academy
 St. Wendelin High School, Fostoria (Closed, 2017)

Catholic radio within the diocese
Catholic Radio began broadcasting in the Diocese of Toledo in 2010, beginning with WJTA followed by WNOC. Several local stations owned by separate entities. These include:
 WNOC 89.7 FM licensed to Bowling Green and based in Toledo as "Annunciation Radio" 
(plus four sister stations): 
 WHRQ 88.1 FM in Sandusky 
 WFOT 89.5 FM in Lexington 
 WSHB 90.9 FM in Willard
 WRRO 89.9 FM in Edon and based in Bryan.

Other stations in the diocese include:
 WJTA 88.9 FM licensed to Glandorf and based in Leipsic serving Putnam and surrounding counties as "Holy Family Radio" which also serves the Findlay and northern portions of the Lima areas.
 WOHA 94.9 FM in Ada, serving the greater Lima area as a simulcast of WJTA.
 WSJG-LP 103.3 FM in Tiffin as "St. John Paul The Great Radio."

References

External links 

Diocesan website

 
Toledo
Christian organizations established in 1910
Culture of Toledo, Ohio
Toledo
1910 establishments in Ohio